Jam County is in Bushehr province, Iran. The capital of the county is the city of Jam. At the 2006 census, the county's population was 37,999 in 8,412 households. The following census in 2011 counted 51,446 people in 13,748 households. At the 2016 census, the county's population was 70,051 in 19,997 households.

Administrative divisions

The population history and structural changes of Jam County's administrative divisions over three consecutive censuses are shown in the following table. The latest census shows two districts, five rural districts, and three cities.

References

 

Counties of Bushehr Province